Uptown is an area near the mid 23rd Street of Oklahoma City due east of Asia District. It includes Oklahoma City University and numerous ethnic shops and gritty venues. Among them, Tower Theatre is currently being remodeled to become a large-scale venue with new storefronts. This project is expected to spin off similar developments as the neighborhood picks up once again.

Geography
The neighborhood is bounded roughly by N.W. 23rd Street on the south, Interstate 235 on the east, Interstate 44 on the north and Pennsylvania on the west.

Neighborhoods in Oklahoma City